José Luís may refer to:
José Luis (footballer, born 1943), Spanish football defender
José Luís (footballer, born 1958), Portuguese football attacking midfielder

See also
Zé Luís (disambiguation)
José Lluis, the Spanish Olympic basketball player